They'll Do It Every Time is a single-panel newspaper comic strip, created by Jimmy Hatlo, which had a long run over eight decades, first appearing on February 5, 1929, and continuing until February 3, 2008. The title of the strip became a popular catchphrase.

Publication history 
Hatlo, a sports cartoonist, created the panel to fill space on the comics page of the San Francisco Call-Bulletin. Hatlo kept producing the panel, and before long readers were sending fan mail. The feature proved so popular that it was eventually syndicated by King Features Syndicate beginning in 1936, with a Sunday panel added on July 4, 1943.

Characters and story
The gags illustrated minor absurdities, frustrations, hypocrisies, ironies and misfortunes of everyday life. These were displayed in a single-panel or two-panel format. If two panels, the left-side panel showed some deceptive, pretentious, unwitting or scheming human behavior, with the second panel revealing the truth of the situation.

Hellish scenes were the subjects of his topper strip, The Hatlo Inferno, which ran with They'll Do It Every Time from 1953 to 1958. An occasional feature of They'll Do It Every Time was "Hatlo's History" which enabled the cartoonist to satirize memorable moments from earlier centuries.

In its early decades, a timid man named Henry Tremblechin was a recurring victim of the strip's observations. Tremblechin's bratty daughter, Little Iodine, appeared so often she graduated into her own comic strip (Aug 15, 1943 – Aug 14, 1983), comic book (1949–62), a 1946 movie and a 1988 animated cartoon show.

A tip of the Hatlo hat
Ideas and gags usually came from suggestions by readers, who were credited with a small acknowledgment box with a tiny drawing of Hatlo tipping his hat. Hatlo continued working on They'll Do It Every Time until his death in 1963 when the team of Al Scaduto and Bob Dunn took over the strip. The readers continued to be credited for their suggestions, but the drawing of the "Hatlo hat" was dropped. 

After Dunn's death in 1989, They'll Do It Every Time was written and drawn by Scaduto, who died December 8, 2007, at age 79. King Features announced that the strip would not continue with another cartoonist and ceased publication on February 2, 2008. At the time of Scaduto's death, King Features was distributing the panel to more than 100 American newspapers.

Awards
 
The strip, as well as Bob Dunn, received the National Cartoonists Society's Newspaper Panel Cartoon Award for 1968, 1969 and 1979 (with Al Scaduto), plus the Reuben Award for 1975. Al Scaduto won the Newspaper Panel Cartoon Award for 1991 and 1997 for his work on the strip.

References

External links
They'll Do It Every Time at Don Markstein's Toonopedia
National Cartoonists Society Awards

American comic strips
1929 comics debuts
2008 comics endings
Gag cartoon comics
Gag-a-day comics
Quotations from comics
Comedy catchphrases
1920s neologisms